Mill Creek or Millcreek may refer to:

Communities

Canada 
Mill Creek, Cape Breton, Nova Scotia, in the Cape Breton Regional Municipality
Mill Creek, Cumberland, Nova Scotia, in Cumberland country

United States 
Millcreek Township (disambiguation), several places
Mill Creek, Pope County, Arkansas, an unincorporated community
Mill Creek, Bakersfield, a district in Downtown Bakersfield, California
Lundy, California, formerly known as Mill Creek
Mill Creek, California, a town in Tehama County
Mill Creek, Delaware, an unincorporated community in New Castle County
Mill Creek Hundred, an unincorporated subdivision of New Castle County, Delaware
Mill Creek, Georgia, an unincorporated community
Mill Creek, Illinois, a village
Mill Creek, Adams County, Illinois, a local name for Hickory Grove, Ellington Township
Mill Creek, Indiana, an unincorporated community in Lincoln Township, LaPorte County
Millcreek, Missouri, an unincorporated community in Castor Township, Madison County
Mill Creek, Oklahoma, a town
Mill Creek, Pennsylvania, a borough in Huntingdon County
Mill Creek, Philadelphia, Pennsylvania, a neighborhood
Millcreek, Utah, a city in Salt Lake County
Mill Creek, Gloucester County, Virginia, an unincorporated community
Mill Creek, Washington, a city in Snohomish County
Mill Creek East, Washington, a CDP in Snohomish County
Mill Creek, West Virginia, a town in Randolph County
Mill Creek, Wisconsin, a ghost town
Mill Creek Community, Wisconsin, an unincorporated community

Streams

Canada 
Mill Creek Ravine, Edmonton, Alberta, on a tributary of the North Saskatchewan River

United Kingdom 
Mill Creek, a tributary of the River Ouse, Sussex in Newhaven

United States

California 
Mill Creek (Los Angeles County, California), a mountain stream in the Angeles National Forest and a major tributary of Big Tujunga Creek
Mill Creek (Mono Lake), in the endorheic Mono-Mojave subregion
Mill Creek (San Bernardino County), a tributary of the Santa Ana River
Mill Creek, a tributary of San Vicente Creek in Santa Cruz County, California
Mill Creek (Tehama County), a tributary of the Sacramento River
Mill Creek (Tulare County), a tributary of the Kaweah River
Old Mill Creek (Arroyo Corte Madera del Presidio), a tributary to Arroyo Corte Madera del Presidio, and thence to Richardson Bay in Marin County

Colorado 
Mill Creek (San Juan River tributary)

Delaware 
Mill Creek (Blackbird Creek tributary), a stream in New Castle County
Mill Creek (Smyrna River tributary), a stream in Kent County
Mill Creek (White Clay Creek tributary), a stream in New Castle County

Georgia 
Mill Creek (Etowah River tributary)
Mill Creek (Muckalee Creek tributary)

Indiana 
Mill Creek (Jackson County, Indiana), a tributary of the White River

Iowa 
Mill Creek (Jackson County, Iowa), a tributary of the Upper Mississippi River
Mill Creek (Johnson County, Iowa)
Mill Creek (Nodaway River tributary), a stream in Iowa and Missouri

Maryland 
Mill Creek (Marshyhope Creek tributary), a stream in Dorchester County, Maryland

Michigan
Mill Creek (Paw Paw River tributary)

Missouri 
Mill Creek (Barren Fork)
Mill Creek (Big River tributary)
Mill Creek (Crane Pond Creek tributary)
Mill Creek (Eleven Point River tributary), a stream in Arkansas and Missouri
Mill Creek (Elk River tributary), a stream in Arkansas and Missouri
Mill Creek (Grandglaize Creek tributary)
Mill Creek (Little Piney Creek tributary), a stream in Phelps County in the Ozarks
Mill Creek (Loutre River tributary)
Mill Creek (Morgan County, Missouri)
Mill Creek (Niangua River tributary)
Mill Creek (Nodaway River tributary), a stream in Iowa and Missouri
Mill Creek (River aux Vases)

New Jersey
Mill Creek Marsh, flows into the Hackensack River

New York 
Mill Creek (Black Creek tributary), flows into Hinckley Reservoir
Mill Creek (Black River tributary), flows into the Black River near Boonville
Mill Creek (Black River, Lyons Falls), flows into the Black River near Lyons Falls
Mill Creek (Black River, Watson), flows into the Black River in Watson
Mill Creek (Fall Creek tributary), a tributary of Fall Creek
Mill Creek (Gravesville, New York), a tributary of West Canada Creek
Mill Creek (Hudson River tributary), in Rensselaer County
Mill Creek (Jamaica Bay), a small stream in Brooklyn that empties into Jamaica Bay
Mill Creek (Owasco Inlet), a tributary of Owasco Inlet in Cayuga County
Mill Creek (Susquehanna River tributary, Otego), a tributary of the Susquehanna River
Mill Creek (West Canada Creek tributary), a tributary of West Canada Creek
Mill Creek (West Kill), converges with West Kill by North Blenheim, New York
Mill Creek (Wharton Creek tributary), a tributary of Wharton Creek

North Carolina
Mill Creek (Pee Dee River tributary), a stream in Anson County
Mill Creek (Coddle Creek tributary), a stream in Cabarrus and Rowan Counties
Mill Creek (Trent River tributary), a stream in Jones County, North Carolina
Mill Creek (Little River tributary), a stream in Moore County
Mill Creek (Deep River tributary), a stream in Randolph County
Mill Creek (Uwharrie River tributary), a stream in Randolph County
Mill Creek (Lanes Creek tributary), a stream in Union County
Mill Creek (Richardson Creek tributary), a stream in Union County

Ohio 
Mill Creek (Ohio), a tributary of the Ohio River
Mill Creek (Scioto River tributary), a stream in central Ohio

Oregon 
Mill Creek (Marion County, Oregon), a tributary of the Willamette River
Mill Creek (Mohawk River tributary), a tributary of the Mohawk River in Lane County

Pennsylvania 
Mill Creek (Delaware River tributary), a stream in Bucks County, Pennsylvania
Mill Creek (Neshaminy Creek tributary, Doylestown Township), a stream in Bucks County, Pennsylvania
Mill Creek (Neshaminy Creek tributary, Northampton Township), a stream in Bucks County, Pennsylvania
Mill Creek (Neshaminy Creek tributary, Wrightstown Township), a stream in Bucks County, Pennsylvania
Mill Creek (Clarion River tributary), a stream in Clarion and Jefferson Counties, Pennsylvania
Mill Creek (Roaring Creek tributary), a stream in Columbia County, Pennsylvania
Mill Creek (Lake Erie), a tributary of Lake Erie and a stream in Erie County, Pennsylvania
Mill Creek (Juniata River tributary), a stream in Huntingdon County, Pennsylvania
Mill Creek (Lackawanna River tributary), a stream in Lackawanna and Lycoming Counties, Pennsylvania
Mill Creek (Conestoga River tributary), a stream in Lancaster County, Pennsylvania
Mill Creek (Reilly Creek tributary), a stream in Luzerne County, Pennsylvania
Mill Creek (Loyalsock Creek tributary), a stream in Lycoming and Sullivan Counties, Pennsylvania
Mill Creek (Susquehanna River tributary), a stream in Luzerne County, Pennsylvania
Mill Creek (French Creek tributary), a stream in Mercer and Venango Counties, Pennsylvania
Mill Creek (Lower Merion, Pennsylvania), a tributary of the Schuylkill River upstream of Philadelphia
Mill Creek (Philadelphia), a tributary of the Schuylkill River and a stream in Montgomery County and Philadelphia City
Mill Creek (Tioga River tributary), a stream in Tioga County, Pennsylvania
Mill Creek (Whitelock Creek tributary), a tributary of Whitelock Creek and a stream in Wyoming County, Pennsylvania

Tennessee 
Mill Creek (Davidson County, Tennessee), a tributary of the Cumberland River

Texas 
Mill Creek (Brazos River tributary), a river draining into the Brazos River

Virginia 
Mill Creek (Whitethorn Creek tributary), a stream in Pittsylvania County, Virginia

West Virginia 
Mill Creek (North Fork South Branch Potomac River tributary), a tributary of the North Fork South Branch Potomac River
Mill Creek (Opequon Creek tributary)
Mill Creek (Patterson Creek tributary), a tributary of Patterson Creek
Mill Creek (South Branch Potomac River tributary), a tributary of the South Branch Potomac River
Mill Creek (western West Virginia), a tributary of the Ohio River

Washington 
Mill Creek (Thurston County, Washington)

Wisconsin 
Mill Creek (Wisconsin River tributary)

Other uses
Historic Mill Creek Discovery Park, in Michigan
Mill Creek (Bakersfield), a linear park in downtown Bakersfield, California; adjacent to the Kern Island Canal
Millcreek Canyon (Salt Lake County, Utah)
Mill Creek chert, a type of stone from southern Illinois used extensively by the Mississippian culture
Mill Creek Correctional Facility, Salem, Oregon
Mill Creek Expressway, Ohio
Mill Creek Generating Station, a coal-fired power plant in Louisville, Kentucky
Mill Creek Elementary School, Warrington, Pennsylvania
Mill Creek High School, in Hoschton, Georgia
Mill Creek Park, in Youngstown, Ohio
Millcreek Mall, shopping center in Erie, Pennsylvania
The Mall at Mill Creek, Secaucus, New Jersey
Millcreek (UTA station), a transit station in South Salt Lake, Utah
Mill Creek Zanja, California

See also
 
 
Mill River (disambiguation) 
Mill (disambiguation)
Mills Creek (disambiguation)
Mill Creek Bridge (disambiguation)
Mill Brook (disambiguation)
Mill Rock Creek, a stream in Crawford and Iron counties, Missouri; a tributary of Huzzah Creek
Mill Spring Creek a small stream in Wayne County, Missouri; a tributary of the Black River.
Mill Valley Creek in Pickleweed Inlet, a small bay in Marin County